Currulao is a Colombian coregiment of the municipality of Turbo in the Department of Antioquia. Currulao became a municipality by ordinance 13 segregating from the town of Turbo as a Special Portuary District. But some months later the Court of Antioquia said that only the Congress of Colombia could solve the lawsuit. Currulao has 21,048 people and 474 km².

References

Populated places in the Antioquia Department